Graham Wilson (1939–2005) was an Australian rugby league footballer who played in the 1960s and 1970s. He played in the New South Wales Rugby Football League premiership for Newtown club and later Cronulla-Sutherland, also achieving state and international representative honours. He is also the father of former North Sydney Bears player Craig Wilson, and Cronulla-Sutherland player Alan Wilson.

Playing career
Originally from Grafton, New South Wales, Wilson made his first grade debut for Newtown in the Sydney premiership as a 16-year-old in 1960. He was first selected to represent New South Wales the following season.

In 1963, the South African team was touring Australia and Wilson represented Sydney against them. Before leaving for New Zealand, the South African team invited Wilson and Canterbury-Bankstown's , Fred Anderson to bolster their injury-ravaged forward pack. Later that year Wilson was selected for the Australia national team for the 1963–64 Kangaroo tour of Great Britain and France, gaining the unusual distinction of playing for two countries in the same year. On tour he played at second-row forward in the third test against France.

Death
Wilson died in December, 2005 in Sydney, aged 66.

Accolades
In 2008, the centenary year of rugby league in Australia, Wilson was named in the Newtown 18-man team of the century.

References

External links
Graham Wilson at rugbyleagueproject.com.au
Graham Wilson at nrlstats.com.au

1939 births
2005 deaths
Australian rugby league players
Newtown Jets players
New South Wales rugby league team players
City New South Wales rugby league team players
Australia national rugby league team players
South Africa national rugby league team players
Cronulla-Sutherland Sharks players
Rugby league forwards
Rugby league players from Grafton, New South Wales